The 2001 AAA Championships was an outdoor track and field competition organised by the Amateur Athletic Association (AAA), held from 13–15 July at Alexander Stadium in Birmingham, England. It was considered the de facto national championships for the United Kingdom.

Following demands from women athletes, a 2001 UK Athletics Championships was held separately specifically for the newly introduced women's 3000 metres steeplechase event. This event was added to the AAA programme in response the following year.

Medal summary

Men

Women

References

AAA Championships
AAA Championships
Athletics Outdoor
AAA Championships
Sports competitions in Birmingham, West Midlands
Athletics competitions in England